Sherrexcia Alexis Rolle (born 19 June, 1988), known as Rexy Rolle, is a Bahamian attorney, airline executive and singer. She is the Vice-President of Operations and General Counsel of Western Air, a privately owned airline in The Bahamas founded by her parents.

Early life and education 
Rexy Rolle was born to Rex Rolle, a pilot, and Shandrice Woodside-Rolle, an entrepreneur. Rex and Shandrice serve as the President & CEO, and Vice-President & COO respectively of Western Air. Rexy is a Christian.

Rolle attended Montverde Academy in Florida. She graduated cum laude from the University of Ottawa in 2010 with a BS in Political Science & Communications, summa cum laude in 2011 with a Masters in Mass Media & Communications from Lynn University, and earned her Juris Doctor from Thomas Jefferson School of Law in 2014.

Career
She is licensed to practice law in the State of California, Washington, D.C. and the Bahamas. She previously worked as a law clerk at two firms. Rolle has VP of operations and General Counsel since 2014, having previously worked in baggage claim. In 2018, Rolle was a speaker at the Pan-African Women Forum (PAWF) in New York City. She began the initiative Gyal on a Mission to mentor young girls to become future business leaders.

Television Appearances
The Platform (2018)
Anatomy of a Queen (2019)

Music
In addition to her aviation career, Rolle is a professional singer.

Singles
Here to Stay featuring Jevvo (2018)
All Our Lives (2020)
How You Feel (2020)

References

External links

1988 births
Living people
Bahamian singers
Bahamian businesspeople
Bahamian women lawyers
Lawyers from Washington, D.C.
California lawyers
Thomas Jefferson School of Law people
University of Ottawa alumni
Lynn University alumni